Mambalam is a residential and commercial area in Chennai (Madras), India.

Mambalam may also refer to:

 Mambalam railway station
 Mambalam taluk